Megan Asha Williams (born June 30, 1984) is a Canadian born writer. Williams published her first book, Our Interrupted Fairy Tale in February 2014, a non-fiction love story about her and her late boyfriend, Chad Warren (February 11, 1975 - November 28, 2009) who died from an incurable blood cancer, multiple myeloma. 

Williams published two children's books (Don’t Call the Office, 2016, I Don’t Want To, 2018) with her step-daughter, Madison Reaveley. 

In January 2017, Williams started The Self Publishing Agency Inc. (TSPA), based in Vancouver, Canada.

Williams and TSPA has published award-winning books for TV and media personalities such as Michael Johnson (The Bachelorette ABC) Making the Love You Want, 2020, Kendall Long (The Bachelor, ABC), Just Curious: A notebook for questions, 2021 Kelley Wolf (The Real World New Orleans), FLOW: Finding Love Over Worry, 2022, Katie Bieksa, Newport Jane, 2017 CEDAR, 2022. 

Williams married Brad Watt in 2016. They have two daughters.

Biography 
Williams was born and raised in New Westminster, British Columbia and graduated from New Westminster Secondary School in 2002. Following high school, Williams attended the University of Wyoming on a Tennis Scholarship. In 2005 Williams transferred schools to Jacksonville University where she finished her bachelor's degree while playing on the Women's Tennis Team (Div. 1) in the Atlantic Sun Conference

While writing Our Interrupted Fairy Tale, Williams worked at the BC Transplant Society in Vancouver, British Columbia as a Communications Manager. Our Interrupted Fairy Tale is a non-fiction, love story told from both Williams' perspective and that of her late boyfriend, Chad Warren (February 11, 1975 - November 28, 2009). The memoir is a collection of dairy and blog entries, letters, cards and emails exchanged between the two during their courtship and Warren's battle with the incurable blood cancer, Multiple Myeloma. The book sold hundreds of copies in the first weeks of its launch in British Columbia, presumably due to the TV, radio and newspaper publicity she received (see references). On April 26, 2014, Williams attended her first American book-signing at Barnes & Noble, Seattle. According to her blog, Williams sold out her inventory in less than two hours.

References

External links
Megan has been featured on a number of TV shows, newspapers, radio shows and blogs.
TV
 The Rush with Fiona Forbes
 Global BC: Global Mornings
 CTV Mornings: CTV Morning Live
 Breakfast Television BC

Radio
 CKNW: The Bill Good Show
 QMFM: The Mike and Tara Show

Newspaper
 The Province: Entertainment Front Page
 North Shore News
 Langley Times
 New Westminster News Leader

1984 births
Living people
Canadian women non-fiction writers
Canadian non-fiction writers
People from New Westminster
University of Wyoming alumni